Lake Hook is a lake in McLeod County, in the U.S. state of Minnesota.

Lake Hook was named for Isaac Hook, a pioneer who settled there in the 1850s.

References

Lakes of Minnesota
Lakes of McLeod County, Minnesota